Eternal Derby also known as the Croatian Derby, is the name given to matches between the two biggest and most popular Croatian football clubs Dinamo Zagreb and Hajduk Split.

The rivalry can be traced back to 1920s when Zagreb's Građanski and Hajduk often clashed in the Kingdom of Yugoslavia championships. After World War II, Građanski was disbanded by the authorities, and Dinamo Zagreb was formed to take its place, retaining its colours. The two clubs soon became part of the "Big Four" of Yugoslav football (the other two being Red Star Belgrade and Partizan Belgrade from Serbia) ever since the Yugoslav championship was established in 1946 (both clubs spent their entire existence playing top-flight football). This lasted until 1991, when Croatia declared independence so clubs started competing in the Prva HNL, which saw its first season being played in 1992. Since 1992 Dinamo and Hajduk won 25 out of 27 Croatian championship titles, as well as 21 out of 27 Croatian Cups, which makes them by far the most successful clubs in Croatia.

Due to various formats that were used in the Croatian championship (which currently employs a four-round robin format) and the cup competition format (which has teams playing one-legged fixtures even in the final game) and in addition to the games played in the Supercup, there can be anywhere from four to six derbies per season. Since the first official match in 1946, there have been over 200 official derbies played in total.

Supporters

Bad Blue Boys 
Bad Blue Boys (BBB) were founded on 17 March 1986 in Zagreb (Croatia), with members from different areas of Zagreb. The name of the group is said to have been inspired by the 1983 film starring Sean Penn, Bad Boys. They are considered one of the most dangerous supporters' groups in the world and are known for their vocal and physical intimidation at football matches. In 2011, Bad Blue Boys were mentioned in the list of 16 "hardcore hooligan firms, ultras groups we wouldn't want to mess with", compiled by the American sports website Bleacher Report. The group's mascot is a bulldog and the official anthem is "Dinamo ja volim" ("I love Dinamo"), by the Croatian pop rock band Pips, Chips & Videoclips. BBB also publish a fanzine about the club and the ultras subculture. The original fanzine was Ajmo plavi (Go Blues) which was replaced in 2006 by Dinamov sjever (Dinamo's North). At home matches in Dinamo Zagreb's Maksimir Stadium, the Bad Blue Boys usually settle behind the home goal on the stadium's north stand. Dinamo's fans are often unmannerly referred to as "purgeri" (a colloquial moniker for a citizen of Zagreb, originating from German bürger) by members of Torcida Split.

Torcida 
Torcida Split or simply Torcida is the Hajduk Split supporters' group. Founded on 28 October 1950, it's known the oldest supporters' groups in Europe. The name of the group comes from torcida, the Brazilian Portuguese word for "supporters". The group as a whole traditionally maintains good relations with the Portuguese Sport Lisboa e Benfica football club supporters No Name Boys. Torcida members gather in the north stand at the stadium of Poljud. Hajduk's fans are often unmannerly referred to as "tovari" (English: donkeys, similar to magarac) by Bad Blue Boys members, as the said animal is the supporters' group official mascot.

Results
All statistics correct as of 21 October 2022.

Key

1946–1991

1992–present

Note: Home team's score always shown first
1 Match abandoned after 86 minutes due to mass fight between both clubs' supporters and the police.
2 Match abandoned after 85 minutes due to crowd trouble.
3 Match was postponed and later abandoned following Hajduk Split's players reluctance to enter the stadium. On 25 November 2014, Croatian Football Federation awarded Dinamo Zagreb a 3–0 win, deeming Hajduk Split's players move as "unjustified".

Records

Players who have played for both teams

Ratko Kacian (as player: Hajduk Split 1939–1941 / Dinamo Zagreb 1945–1949)
Branko Stinčić (as player: Hajduk Split 1946–1948 / Dinamo Zagreb 1950–1953)
Božidar Senčar (as player: Dinamo Zagreb 1946–1947, 1951–1952 / Hajduk Split 1952–1954)
Svemir Delić (as player: Dinamo Zagreb 1949–1952 / Hajduk Split 1952–1954)
Hrvoje Jukić (as player: Hajduk Split 1956–1957 / Dinamo Zagreb 1966–1968)
Vilson Džoni (as player: Hajduk Split 1968–1978 / Dinamo Zagreb 1978–1979)
Damir Maričić (as player: Hajduk Split 1976–1977, 1978–1981 / Dinamo Zagreb 1983–1984)
Stjepan Deverić (as player: Dinamo Zagreb 1979–1984, 1987–1991 / Hajduk Split 1984–1987)
Dražen Boban (as player: Dinamo Zagreb 1985–1988, 1989–1990, 1994–1995 / Hajduk Split 1988–1989)
Vlado Papić (as player: Hajduk Split 1986–1988 / Dinamo Zagreb 1988–1989)
Saša Peršon (as player: Dinamo Zagreb 1990–1992 / Hajduk Split 1992–1995)
Željko Šoić (as player: Dinamo Zagreb 1991–1993 / Hajduk Split 1993)
Mario Novaković (as player: Hajduk Split 1988–1990, 1991–1993 / Dinamo Zagreb 1993–1995)
Joško Jeličić (as player: Hajduk Split 1987–1993 / Dinamo Zagreb 1993–1995, 1997–2001)
Srđan Mladinić (as player: Hajduk Split 1993–1994 / Dinamo Zagreb 1995–1998)
Renato Jurčec (as player: Hajduk Split 1994–1996 / Dinamo Zagreb 1996–1998)
Mladen Mladenović (as player: Dinamo Zagreb 1989–1991 / Hajduk Split 1997–1998)
Ardian Kozniku (as player: Hajduk Split 1990–1994 / Dinamo Zagreb 1998–2000)
Goce Sedloski (as player: Hajduk Split 1996–1998 / Dinamo Zagreb 1998–2005)
Mario Bazina (as player: Hajduk Split 1992–1995 / Dinamo Zagreb 1999–2001)
Tomislav Rukavina (as player: Dinamo Zagreb 1995–1999 / Hajduk Split 2003–2005)
Ivan Bošnjak (as player: Hajduk Split 2000–2002 / Dinamo Zagreb 2003–2006)
Mate Dragičević (as player: Dinamo Zagreb 2002–2004 / Hajduk Split 2004–2006)
Niko Kranjčar (as player: Dinamo Zagreb 2001–2004 / Hajduk Split 2005–2006)
Danijel Hrman (as player: Dinamo Zagreb 2004 / Hajduk Split 2005–2006)
Mario Grgurović (as player: Hajduk Split 2003–2006 / Dinamo Zagreb 2006) 
Mladen Bartolović (as player: Dinamo Zagreb 2003–2004 / Hajduk Split 2006–2009)
Mirko Hrgović (as player: Hajduk Split 2006–2008 / Dinamo Zagreb 2008–2009)
Dario Jertec (as player: Dinamo Zagreb 2007–2008 / Hajduk Split 2008–2010)
Marijan Buljat (as player: Dinamo Zagreb 2004–2008 / Hajduk Split 2008–2012)
Ivo Smoje (as player: Dinamo Zagreb 2001–2002 / Hajduk Split 2009–2010)
Ante Rukavina (as player: Hajduk Split 2007–2008 / Dinamo Zagreb 2010–2014)
Duje Čop (as player: Hajduk Split 2009–2011 / Dinamo Zagreb 2012–2015, 2021–2022)
Ruben Lima (as player: Hajduk Split 2011–2013 / Dinamo Zagreb 2013–2014)
Franko Andrijašević (as player: Hajduk Split 2010–2014 / Dinamo Zagreb 2014–2016)
Ivan Anton Vasilj (as player: Hajduk Split 2014–2015 / Dinamo Zagreb 2017–2018)
Mario Budimir (as player: Hajduk Split 2004–2006 / Dinamo Zagreb 2018–2019)
Dario Špikić (as player: Hajduk Split 2017–2020 / Dinamo Zagreb 2021–present)

Players who have played for one club in youth career and for rival club in senior career

Stipe Lapić (youth career: Hajduk Split 1995–2001 / senior career: Dinamo Zagreb 2003–2004)
Teo Kardum (youth career: Hajduk Split 2000–2003 / youth career: Dinamo Zagreb 2003–2004 / senior career: Dinamo Zagreb 2004–2006)
Mladen Pelaić (youth career: Dinamo Zagreb 2000–2004 / senior career: Hajduk Split 2007–2010) 
Ivan Ćurjurić (youth career: Dinamo Zagreb 2006–2007 / youth career: Hajduk Split 2007–2008 / senior career: Hajduk Split 2008–2009)
Mate Maleš (youth career: Hajduk Split 2007–2008 / senior career: Dinamo Zagreb 2008)
Mario Maloča (youth career: Dinamo Zagreb 1998–2004 / youth career: Hajduk Split 2007–2008 / senior career: Hajduk Split 2008–2015)
Ante Puljić (youth career: Hajduk Split 2005–2006 / senior career: Dinamo Zagreb 2011, 2012–2013)
Filip Ozobić (youth career: Dinamo Zagreb 2006–2007 / senior career: Hajduk Split 2012–2013) 
Tomislav Kiš (youth career: Dinamo Zagreb 2005–2008 / youth career: Hajduk Split 2011–2012 / senior career: Hajduk Split 2012–2015)
Josip Čalušić (youth career: Hajduk Split 2004–2005, 2007–2009 / youth career: Dinamo Zagreb 2010–2011 / senior career: Dinamo Zagreb 2013–2016)
Ivan Prskalo (youth career: Dinamo Zagreb 2010–2012 / youth career: Hajduk Split 2012–2014 / senior career: Hajduk Split 2014–2016)
Marko Pejić (youth career: Dinamo Zagreb 2007–2013 / senior career: Hajduk Split 2015–2016)
Fran Tudor (youth career: Dinamo Zagreb 2005–2007 / senior career: Hajduk Split 2015–2019)
David Čolina (youth career: Dinamo Zagreb 2009–2018 / senior career: Hajduk Split 2019–present)
Filip Krovinović (youth career: Dinamo Zagreb 2007–2009 / senior career: Hajduk Split 2021–present)
Martin Baturina (youth career: Hajduk Split 2012–2015 / youth career: Dinamo Zagreb 2017–2021 / senior career: Dinamo Zagreb 2021–present)
Deni Jurić (youth career: Hajduk Split 2016–2018 / senior career: Dinamo Zagreb 2021–present)
Jakov-Anton Vasilj (youth career: Hajduk Split 2014–2017 / youth career: Dinamo Zagreb 2017–2021 / senior career: Dinamo Zagreb 2021–2022)

Players who have scored for both clubs in the derby

Stjepan Deverić (4 goals, 3 for Dinamo Zagreb and 1 for Hajduk Split)
Joško Jeličić (4 goals, 3 for Dinamo Zagreb and 1 for Hajduk Split)
Ante Rukavina (2 goals, 1 for Dinamo Zagreb and 1 for Hajduk Split)
Božidar Senčar (3 goals, 2 for Dinamo Zagreb and 1 for Hajduk Split)

Coaches who have managed both teams

Branko Zebec (as manager: Dinamo Zagreb 1965–1967, 1984 / Hajduk Split 1972–1973)
Vlatko Marković (as manager: Hajduk Split 1977–1978 / Dinamo Zagreb 1978–1988, 1983, 1990–1991, 1992)
Tomislav Ivić (as manager: Hajduk Split 1968–1972, 1973–1976, 1978–1980 / Dinamo Zagreb 1986–1987)
Josip Skoblar (as manager: Hajduk Split 1986–1987, 1990–1991 / Dinamo Zagreb 1988–1989)
Nenad Gračan (as manager: Hajduk Split 2001 / Dinamo Zagreb 2004)
Miroslav Blažević (as manager: Dinamo Zagreb 1981–1983, 1985–1988, 1992–1994, 2002–2003 / Hajduk Split 2005)
Željko Kopić (as manager: Hajduk Split 2017–2018 / Dinamo Zagreb 2021–2022)

Top scorers
Updated 22 November 2019

Honours
These are the major football honours of Dinamo and Hajduk.

Domestic league results

Yugoslav First League results (1946–1991)

The tables list the place each team took in each of the seasons.

Prva HNL results (1992 onwards)

The tables list the place each team took in each of the seasons.

See also
Adriatic derby
Dinamo–Rijeka derby

References

External links
The Classic: Dinamo Zagreb-Hajduk Split at FIFA.com

Football derbies in Croatia
GNK Dinamo Zagreb
HNK Hajduk Split
1946 establishments in Croatia